In Norse mythology, Hábrók is, according to Grímnismál, and quoted by Snorri Sturluson in Gylfaginning, as the "best of hawks" in a list containing various other names which represent the best of things. However, nothing more is known of this creature. The name is translated as "High Pants" which may refer to the bird's long legs.

Notes

References

Birds in Norse mythology
Mythological birds of prey